Anthony Wayne Franklin (born June 9, 1950, at Portland, Maine) is an American manager in minor league baseball and a former infielder in the minor leagues. In 2015, he was named manager of the Pulaski Yankees in Virginia.

Early life
Franklin graduated from Centennial High School in Compton, California, and attended Los Angeles City College.

Career
In his finest season, 1973 with the Trois-Rivières Aigles of the Eastern League, Franklin batted .267 with 27 extra base hits in 116 games. As a player, he was a switch hitter who threw right-handed, and stood 5'10" (178 cm) tall, who weighed 165 pounds (75 kg). During his nine-year playing career, he batted .231 in 2,740 at bats with 13 home runs and 221 runs batted in.

Franklin's managing and coaching responsibilities began with the Baltimore Orioles in 1979 as a coach with their Rochester Red Wings Triple-A farm club. After three years in the Oriole system, Franklin became a manager in 1982 with the Cubs' Short Season Class A team, the Geneva Cubs of the New York–Penn League. After managing lower-level Cub affiliates for five seasons, Franklin moved to the Chicago White Sox farm system, and eventually reached the Double-A level with the 1991–92 Birmingham Barons. Franklin managed with the White Sox organization in 1989–93. He led the 1991 Barons to the Southern League championship where they lost in the league finals. He also managed the South Bend White Sox to the Midwest League championship in 1993.

He was the minor league infield instructor for the San Diego Padres in 1996–2006 and was interim skipper of the 2000 Las Vegas Stars of the Pacific Coast League before assuming his current post with the Yankees' organization in 2007.

Through 2014, his 19-year minor-league managerial record was 1,220–1,117 (.522) with three league championships. On June 2, 2012, Franklin won his 1,000th career regular season ballgame.

In January 2015, the Yankees named Al Pedrique manager of the  Thunder, but noted that Franklin will remain in the Bombers' organization.  He was named the  manager of the Pulaski Yankees of the Rookie-level Appalachian League.

References

 1983 Chicago Cubs Organizational Record Book. St. Petersburg, Florida: Baseball Blue Blook, 1983.
 Baseball Reference.com
 Nalbone, John (August 29, 2011.) "Despite "tough season'' Trenton Thunder manager Tony Franklin would return in 2012." Nj.com. Accessed October 2011.

External links

1950 births
Living people
Baltimore Orioles scouts
Las Vegas 51s managers
Sportspeople from Compton, California
Los Angeles City College alumni
Sportspeople from Portland, Maine
Baseball players from Maine
Tampa Tarpons (1957–1987) players
Trois-Rivières Aigles players
Indianapolis Indians players
Midland Cubs players
Wichita Aeros players
Quebec Metros players
West Palm Beach Expos players
Rochester Red Wings players
Trenton Thunder managers
Birmingham Barons managers
Baseball coaches from Maine